A CD ripper, CD grabber, or CD extractor is software that rips raw digital audio in Compact Disc Digital Audio (CD-DA) format tracks on a compact disc to standard computer sound files, such as WAV or MP3.

A more formal term used for the process of ripping audio CDs is digital audio extraction (DAE).

History
In the early days of computer CD-ROM drives and audio compression mechanisms (such as MP2), CD ripping was considered undesirable by copyright holders, with some attempting to retrofit copy protection into the simple ISO9660 standard. As time progressed, most music publishers became more open to the idea that since individuals had bought the music, they should be able to create a copy for their own personal use on their own computer. This is not yet entirely true; even with some current digital music delivery mechanisms, there are considerable restrictions on what an end user can do with their paid for (and therefore personally licensed) audio. Windows Media Player's default behavior is to add copy protection measures to ripped music, with a disclaimer that if this is not done, the end user is held entirely accountable for what is done with their music. This suits most users who simply want to store their music on a memory stick, MP3 player or portable hard disk and listen to it on any PC or compatible device.

Etymology
The Jargon File entry for rip notes that the term originated in Amiga slang, where it referred to the extraction of multimedia content from program data.

Design
As an intermediate step, some ripping programs save the extracted audio in a lossless format such as WAV, FLAC, or even raw PCM audio. The extracted audio can then be encoded with a lossy codec like MP3, Vorbis, WMA or AAC.  The encoded files are more compact and are suitable for playback on digital audio players.  They may also be played back in a media player program on a computer.

Most ripping programs will assist in tagging the encoded files with metadata. The MP3 file format, for example, allows tags with title, artist, album and track number information.  Some will try to identify the disc being ripped by looking up network services like AMG's LASSO, FreeDB, Gracenote's CDDB, GD3  or MusicBrainz, or  attempt text extraction if CD-Text has been stored.

Some all-in-one ripping programs can simplify the entire process by ripping and burning the audio to disc in one step, possibly re-encoding the audio on-the-fly in the process.

Some CD ripping software is specifically intended to provide an especially accurate or "secure" rip, including Exact Audio Copy, cdda2wav, CDex and cdparanoia.

Compact disc seek jitter
In the context of digital audio extraction from compact discs, seek jitter causes extracted audio samples to be doubled-up or skipped entirely if the Compact Disc drive re-seeks. The problem occurs because the Red Book does not require block-accurate addressing during seeking. As a result, the extraction process may restart a few samples early or late, resulting in doubled or omitted samples. These glitches often sound like tiny repeating clicks during playback. A successful approach to correction in software involves performing overlapping reads and fitting the data to find overlaps at the edges. Most extraction programs perform seek jitter correction.  CD manufacturers avoid seek jitter by extracting the entire disc in one continuous read operation, using special CD drive models at slower speeds so the drive does not re-seek.

Optical drive properties
Properties of an optical drive helping in achieving a perfect rip are a small sample-offset (at best zero), no jitter, no or deactivateable caching, and a correct implementation and feed-back of the C1 and C2 error-states. There are databases listing these features for multiple brands and versions of optical drives. Also, EAC has the ability to autodetect some of these features by a test-rip of a known reference CD.

Examples
Notable CD ripper applications include the following ones:

BSD and Linux

Asunder
Cdda2wav
cdparanoia
fre:ac
Grip
K3b
Ripit
Sound Juicer
VLC media player
 

Mac OS X

cdparanoia
fre:ac
iTunes
VLC media player
 

Windows

Audiograbber
CDex
Exact Audio Copy
foobar2000
fre:ac
iTunes
JRiver Media Center 
MediaMonkey
Musicmatch Jukebox
VLC media player
Winamp
Windows Media Player

See also
DVD ripper
Hard disk recorder

Notes

References

External links

 
 Ripping